Borankol Oil Field is an oil field located in Mangystau Province. It was discovered in 1998 and developed by Ascom Group. In 2010, the Republic of Kazakhstan cancelled the Subsoil Use Contracts for Borankol and the neighbouring Tolkyn gas field.

References 

Oil fields of Kazakhstan